Arez Cobain  (born April 7, 1988) is an American rapper, producer, studio engineer, and songwriter. Arez Cobain, is from Los Angeles, California. In April 2015, Arez Cobain emerged into the music blog world on the release of Cashis first single "Kingpin" featuring Young Buck, Arez Cobain, & June B (produced by Rikanatti & The Coalition) off his new album County Hound 3. In July, Arez Cobain followed up with a single release of his own titled "Bass Down Low" featuring multiplatinum selling artists Lil Flip & Dirty Mouth of Trillville as well as German rapper Joe Young. The single was powered by international DJ Tomekk and produced by Decio Beatz & All Star of Loonie Tunez Beat Squad. On October 2, the birthday of the late D12 member Proof, Arez Cobain was featured on HipHopDX Presents The Watch: Big Proof Forever (Ep. 1) on the record "Fallen Soldiers" by D12 featuring Top Prospect, Big Herk, & Arez Cobain.

References 

American hip hop musicians